Nicolae Culianu (August 28, 1832 – November 28, 1915) was a Moldavian, later Romanian mathematician and astronomer.

A native of Iași, he enrolled in the University of Paris after graduating from Academia Mihăileană in 1855, and earned his undergraduate degree in mathematics in 1860. He remained there until 1863, performing research at the Paris Observatory. Initially a high school teacher, he later joined the astronomy and geodesy faculty of the University of Iași, where he served as dean of the sciences faculty, and from 1880 to 1898 as rector. He was a close associate of Titu Maiorescu, a member of the Junimea movement that the latter led, and involved in the educational reform movement it promoted. As such, he was among the founders of a private high school in Iași, to which he donated a group of buildings. While active in Junimea, his renowned affability and venerable bearing earned him the nickname "Papa Culiano". He was elected a corresponding member of the Romanian Academy in 1889.

He helped found the Iași astronomical observatory for the use of students and teachers, and published textbooks on mathematics and geodesy. He was among the founders , the country's first scientific periodical addressed to young people and to a generalist audience. Briefly involved in politics, he was vice president of the Romanian Senate during the fourth conservative government of Lascăr Catargiu (1892–1896).

Culianu's textbooks include an 1870 one on differential and integral calculus, the first published Romanian-language course on mathematical analysis; and ones on elementary algebra (1872), applied geometry (1874), plane and spherical trigonometry (1875), cosmography (1893), plane trigonometry (1894), and high-school cosmography (1895). He was buried in Eternitatea Cemetery. His great-grandson was Ioan Petru Culianu.

References

External links
 Olga Diaconu, "Institutele Unite – veche școală particulară model", in Recreații Matematice, nr.2/2012, pp. 128–30

1832 births
1915 deaths
Scientists from Iași
People of the Principality of Moldavia
Conservative Party (Romania, 1880–1918) politicians
Members of the Senate of Romania
Junimists
Romanian mathematicians
Romanian astronomers
Romanian geodesists
Romanian schoolteachers
Romanian textbook writers
Romanian expatriates in France
University of Paris alumni
Academic staff of Alexandru Ioan Cuza University
Rectors of Alexandru Ioan Cuza University
Corresponding members of the Romanian Academy
Burials at Eternitatea cemetery